The Salvation Army Congress Hall is a heritage-listed building in Perth, Western Australia, built for and initially occupied by the Salvation Army. Located at 69 Murray Street, it was built in 192930 in the Inter-War Georgian architectural style. The foundation stone was laid on 3 August 1929 by the governor, Sir William Campion.

The Salvation Army sold the property in 1991.

See also
 The Salvation Army in Australia

References

Murray Street, Perth
State Register of Heritage Places in the City of Perth